Iacobescu is a Romanian surname, derived from the given name Jacob. Notable people with the name include:

 Antonia Iacobescu (born 1989), Romanian singer and model
 Dumitru Iacobescu (1893–1913), Romanian Symbolist poet
 George Iacobescu (born 1945), Romanian-British businessman, the chief executive of Canary Wharf Group

See also 
 Iacobeşti (plural form)

Romanian-language surnames
Patronymic surnames
Surnames from given names